Grobiņa Parish is an administrative unit of South Kurzeme Municipality in the Courland region of Latvia.

Villages of Grobiņa parish 

 Ālande
 Āres
 Cimdenieki
 Dubeņi
 Gūžas
 Iļģi
 Keramika
 Robežnieki
 Rolava
 Tilti
 Vītiņi 

Parishes of Latvia
South Kurzeme Municipality
Courland